Jacob Spångberg (born June 12, 1994) is a Swedish ice hockey defenceman. During the 2021–22 season he played for Väsby IK of the HockeyEttan league.

Spångberg made his Swedish Hockey League debut playing with AIK IF during the 2013–14 SHL season.

References

External links

1994 births
AIK IF players
Living people
Swedish ice hockey defencemen
People from Täby Municipality
Sportspeople from Stockholm County